The canton of Dieulefit is an administrative division of the Drôme department, southeastern France. Its borders were modified at the French canton reorganisation which came into effect in March 2015. Its seat is in Dieulefit.

It consists of the following communes:
 
Aleyrac
La Bâtie-Rolland
La Bégude-de-Mazenc
Bézaudun-sur-Bîne
Bonlieu-sur-Roubion
Bourdeaux
Bouvières
Charols
Cléon-d'Andran
Comps
Condillac
Crupies
Dieulefit
Eyzahut
Félines-sur-Rimandoule
Francillon-sur-Roubion
La Laupie
Manas
Marsanne
Montjoux
Mornans
Orcinas
Le Poët-Célard
Le Poët-Laval
Pont-de-Barret
Portes-en-Valdaine
Puygiron
Puy-Saint-Martin
Rochebaudin
Rochefort-en-Valdaine
Roche-Saint-Secret-Béconne
Roynac
Saint-Gervais-sur-Roubion
Saint-Marcel-lès-Sauzet
Salettes
Saou
Sauzet
Souspierre
Soyans
Teyssières
Les Tonils
La Touche
Truinas
Vesc

References

Cantons of Drôme